The Lycée Charlemagne is located in the Marais quarter of the 4th arrondissement of Paris, the capital city of France.

Constructed many centuries before it became a lycée, the building originally served as the home of the Order of the Jesuits. The lycée itself was founded by Napoléon Bonaparte and celebrated its bicentennial in 2004.

The lycée is directly connected to the Collège Charlemagne (formerly known as le petit lycée) which is located directly across from it, on the Rue Charlemagne.

Also the lycée offers two-year courses preparing students for entry to the Grandes écoles, divided into seven classes:
three first-year classes: 
two of mathematics, physics, and engineering science 
one of physics, chemistry, and engineering science
four second-year classes: 
two of mathematics and physics
two of physics and chemistry.

History
The school is associated with Charlemagne Middle School that is located just opposite it, on Rue Charlemagne, and is alongside the walls of Philippe Auguste, of which only the exterior cladding still exists.

In 1580, The Cardinal de Bourbon bought the Duchess of Montmorency's Hotel of Rochepot and Damville. He gave it to the Jesuits, who demolished the main building located along the Rue Saint Antoine and replaced it with a chapel dedicated to St. Louis, in 1582.

Between 1627 and 1647, the Jesuits built a building destined to become their home on the grounds of Philippe-Auguste. This home became one of the most famous of the order. It is the home of the confessors of Kings, whose father La Chaise confessors of Louis XIV with Father Michel Le Tellier and renowned preachers such as Bourdaloue or Ménestrier and Father Pierre Cotton, which was that of Henri IV and Louis XIII.

From 1762 to 1767, the buildings were deserted after the expulsion of the Society of Jesus
under the ministry of the Duke of Choiseul.

On 23 May 1767 the Génovéfains of Val-des-Écoliers bought the House of the Jesuits for 400,000 pounds; the regular canons of the reform of Saint Genevieve left their priory of Saint Catherine of Couture (that fell into ruins) and occupied the ancient Jesuit novitiate, which they called Royal Priory of St. Louis of Couture (or culture).

They rented the large library gallery to the city of Paris. It was established from 1773 until the year 1790, the public library in the city of Paris.

At the French Revolution, the Constituent Assembly having suppressed the monastic orders, on 17 March 1795 (27 Ventose Year III) an order of the management board put the library of the Commune at the disposal of the National Institute of Sciences and Arts, who plundered the bottom (20-30 000 books).

In 1797, the former Professed House of the Jesuits became the Central School of the Saint-Antoine Street. Under the Empire, Joseph Lakanal accepted the chair of ancient languages at the Central School of the Saint-Antoine Street.

The Law of 11 Floreal (1 May 1802) rechristened the central school of Saint-Antoine street,  which became the Lycee Charlemagne.

The imperial decree of 24 Brumaire year XIII showed the willingness to install the high school near the Place des Vosges, in the house of Minimes; but the decree of 21 March 1812 confirmed its presence and authorised the expansion of the high school that receives then four hundred residents (external).

In 1815, it was rechristened, and became the College Royal de Charlemagne.

Chapel

The chapel of St. Louis, in 1582, was replaced by the present church in 1627. King Louis XIII laid the first stone, and it was known as the Saint-Louis des Jesuits. The church was designed by two Jesuit architects, Étienne Martellange and François Derand. The first mass was celebrated on 9 May 1641 by Cardinal Richelieu, benefactor of the church in 1634, to whom he offered the beautiful oak doors carved with the initials of the Society of Jesus. Bourdaloue made her debut in 1669 and there, pronounced the funeral oration of the Grand Condé in 1687. Bossuet and Fléchier also preached. In the original chapel, was baptized in 1626 Marie-Chantal of Rabutin, the future Ms. de Sevigne.

Structure
The school welcomes seven second classes, a first and last L, a first and last ES, 1st five and six terminal S. The current headmaster is Pierrette Floc'h, succeeding Alberto Munoz in 2011.
The school is ranked 22nd of 99 in the departmental level in terms of quality of education, and 185th nationally. The ratings are determined by three criteria: the level of success, the proportion of students who obtained a bachelor's degree having spent their last two years of school at the establishment, and the added value (calculated from the social background of students, their age and their results at national certificate).

It also hosts preparatory classes for schools, namely two classes of MPSI, a class of HPIC for the first year, an MP, and a PC for the second year.

In 2015, L'Étudiant gave the following ranking for competitions in 2014:

Notable alumni

Claude Allègre, geochemist and politician
Mathieu Amalric, actor and director
Jean-Charles Alphand (1817-1891), engineer of roads and bridges 
Henry Aron (1842–1885), journalist
Xavier Aubryet, writer
Honoré de Balzac, (1799-1850), novelist
Gérard Baste, singer and TV presenter
Adrien Berbrugger, archaeologist
Maurice Berteaux, minister of war, killed by an airplane
Francis Blanche, actor
Louis Auguste Blanqui, republican
Léon Blum, politician
Louis Bourdon, mathematician 
Nicolas Léonard Sadi Carnot, physicist
Jean Cassou, poet, resistant
Ernest Cauvin, politician
Maurice Cocagnac, Dominican
Fustel de Coulanges, historian
Victor Cousin, philosopher
Louis Delluc, director
Dante Desarthe, director
Pierre Dezarnaulds (1879-1975), politician
Gustave Doré, painter and illustrator
Claude Érignac, prefect
Jean-Pierre Frimbois, journalist
Théophile Gautier, poet and novelist
Arthur H, singer
Jacques Hadamard (1865-1963), mathematician
François-Victor Hugo, third son of Victor Hugo, translator of Shakespeare
Joseph Joffre, Marshal of France
Lionel Jospin, politician
Jean-Daniel Jurgensen, resistant, diplomat 
Guy Lardreau, philosopher
Jules Lagneau, philosopher
Alexandre Ledru-Rollin, lawyer, politician
Claude Lemaitre-Basset, politician
Pierre Leroux, inventor of the word “socialism”
François Léotard, politician
Philippe Léotard, comedian
Auguste Maquet, writer, collaborator of Alexandre Dumas
Léon Moussinac, film critic, resistant, director of the IDHEC
Pierre Messmer, politician
Maurice Meuleau, writer, historian, professor and researcher at the CNRS
Jules Michelet, writer
Robi Morder (1954-), labor lawyer and political scientist, specialist of high school students and student movements
Gérard de Nerval, writer
F'Murrr (Richard Peyzaret), cartoonist
Jean Richepin, de l'Académie française, poet and writer
Raymond Radiguet, writer
Jules Renard, writer
Adrien Barthélemy Louis Henri Rieunier, Admiral AP and Minister of Marine (1893)
Gérard Rinaldi, actor and singer
Pierre Rosenberg, art critic, director at the Louvre, academician
Jean Sablon (1906-1994), Mireille interpreter
Charles Augustin Sainte-Beuve, literary critic, writer
Léon Schwartzenberg, oncologist
Auguste Vacquerie, poet, photographer and journalist, half brother of Léopoldine Hugo
Félix de Vandenesse, master of requests of Louis XVIII
Manuel Valls, politician
Count Wladyslaw Zamoyski, landowner, ecologist and philanthropist

Former teachers
Auguste Angellier (1848-1911), anglicist, literary critic
Jean Bayet (1882-1969), a Latin scholar, member of the Académie des Inscriptions et Belles-Lettres
Louis Benaerts (1868-1941), historian
Elie Bloncourt (1896-1978), MP, member of the High Court
Jean-Louis Burnouf (1775-1844), a Latin scholar, member of the Académie des Inscriptions et Belles-Lettres
Félicien Challaye 
Eugène Charles Catalan (1814-1894), mathematician
Eugène Chevreul (1786-1889), chemist
Paul Couderc (1899-1981), astronomer
Fabié François (1846-1928), Aveyron poet 
Louis-Benjamin Francoeur (1773-1849), mathematician, member of the Academy of Sciences
Louis Gallouédec (1864-1937), Inspector General, Chairman of the General Council of Loiret
Pierre George (1909-2006), geographer, member of the Academy of Moral and Political Sciences
Alexandre Langlois (1788-1854), Indian scholar, translator of the Rig-veda, member of the Académie des Inscriptions et Belles-Lettres
Gustave Lanson (1857-1934), critic and literary historian
Téeodore Lefebvre (1889-1943), geographer, resistant, beheaded in the prison of Wolfenbüttel
Edward Lucas (1842-1891), mathematician
Robert Mandrou (1921-1984) historian and professor at the EHESS and the University of Paris X.
Gustave Rivet (1848-1936), parliamentarian and Dauphiné poet
Eugène Rouche (1832-1910), mathematician
Amédée Thalamas (1867-1953), geographer, MP for Seine-et-Oise

See also
 List of Jesuit sites

References

External links
 Site du Lycée Charlemagne 

Lycées in Paris
Buildings and structures in the 4th arrondissement of Paris
Educational institutions established in 1802
1802 establishments in France